JBF may refer to:
 James Beard Foundation, an American culinary professional association
 James Beard Foundation Award
 Japan Bandy Federation
 Jordan Basketball Federation, who control the Jordan national basketball team
 Jordan Billiard Federation, a member of the Asian Carom Billiard Confederation
 Journal of Business Forecasting
 Joyce Banda Foundation, a school in Malawi